Yaa Asantewaa Festival is an annual festival celebrated by the chiefs and peoples of Ejisu Traditional Area in the Ashanti Region of Ghana. It is usually celebrated in the month of August.

Another important Yaa Asantewaa Festival was founded by the Royal House of Queen Mother Saa Pogh Naa Yaa Asantewaa Ababio II, to remember the 95th Year of the Home Calling of Queen Yaa Asantewaa, and to honor Her unforgettable heroism and extraordinary bravery, that She exhibited during the War of the Golden Stool, aka the Yaa Asantewaa Independence War.

The 9 day festival also paid respects to Queen Mother Yaa Akya, Mother of King Nana Prempeh and all of the other Kings and Chiefs who were exiled to Seychelles by the British in the early 1900s. These included the Sultan of Perak Abdullah Muhammad Shah II of Perak, the King of Buganda Mwanga II of Buganda and the King of Bunyoro Chwa II Kabalega Other notable political exiles were, Makarios III, first President of the Republic of the Seychelles; and Saad Zaghloul, 17th Prime Minister of Egypt.

Celebrations 
In Ejisu Kumasi, there is durbar of chiefs which is presided by paramount chief of Ejisu.

On the island of the Seychelles, a special memorial ceremony was organised on the 17th October 2016, to mark the 95th anniversary of the passing of the legendary African warrior Queen Mother Nana Yaa Asantewaa in Seychelles on October 17, 1921. The memorial ceremony was organised by the Office of the Reincarnation Successor Saa Pogh Naa Yaa Asantewaa Ababio II of the Tano Yaw (UNESCO) world heritage listed shrine in Ejisu Ghana; sponsored by Ethiopian Airlines, in collaboration with the Seychelles ministry responsible for culture along with the National Archives.

Also in the Seychelles, there is an exhibition, entitled Saint Yaa Asantewaa Memorial Exhibition, that was reported by the Seychelles Nations as being a special exhibition, that was officially opened on the 21st October 2016, at the National History Museums by Queen Yaa Asantewaa's Reincarnation Successor Queen Mother Saa Pogh Naa, to mark the 95th anniversary of the passing of legendary fearless warrior Queen Mother Nana Yaa Asantewaa of Ghana, who passed away in Seychelles on October 17, 1921.

Significance 
The chiefs and the inhabitants of Ejisu pay homage to Yaa Asantewaa who was known as an Ashanti war heroine who led in a battle against the British in 1901. The festival also commemorate her bravery for resisting the British from capturing the Golden Stool of the Ashantis which led to an uprising in the late 1690s.

References 

Festivals in Ghana